Anup Bhandari is an Indian film director, composer and lyricist who works primarily in Kannada cinema. He made his directorial début with the mystery thriller film Rangitaranga, featuring his brother Nirup Bhandari, in 2015.

Early life
Anup Bhandari was born on 2 March 1982 in Puttur, Karnataka to Sudhakar Bhandary and Rathna Bhandary. He was brought up in Mysore, where he obtained his bachelor's degree in Information Science from Vidya Vikas Institute of Engineering and Technology. After graduating, he joined Infosys Technologies as a Software Engineer in Mysore and eventually moved to USA, where he worked for almost a decade before returning to India to make his debut feature film.

Career
Bhandari started off making short films while working for Infosys and won several awards. While in the US, he directed a short film called "WORDS" starring Hollywood actor Russell Harvard of There Will Be Blood and Fargo fame. This paved way for his debut feature film RangiTaranga, starring his brother Nirup Bhandari, Radhika Narayan, Avantika Shetty and Sai Kumar.

RangiTaranga turned out to be one of the biggest blockbusters. It also opened overseas market for Kannada films in a big way. It became the first Kannada film to release in many countries, the first Kannada film to appear on the New York Box Office Listing and the first and only Kannada film to run for 50 days in USA. RangiTaranga was also one of the 305 films shortlisted for the Academy Awards (The Oscars) but did not make it to the final nominations.

Anup won several awards for his direction, music direction and lyrics including Filmfare, SIIMA, IIFA and Karnataka State Award.

Anup followed this up with Rajaratha starring Nirup Bhandari, Avantika Shetty and Tamil actor Arya in a pivotal role. The film is narrated from the point of view of a bus, which was voiced by Puneeth Rajkumar.

He also provided the music and wrote lyrics for Rockline Productions' Aadi Lakshmi Puraana directed by Priya V and starring Nirup Bhandari and Radhika Pandit. He penned the lyrics for all the songs of Dabangg3 Kannada version

2022 saw the release of the blockbuster mystery thriller Vikrant Rona with Kichcha Sudeep, which was appreciated for its high standards of making, performances and technical brilliance. It was an unrelated prequel to his debut feature film RangiTaranga.

Personal life

Anup Bhandari is married to Neetha Shetty, who works as costume designer for all his films. They have a daughter Nishka Bhandari. His brother Nirup Bhandari is an actor.

Filmography

Awards

References

Film directors from Karnataka
Living people
1982 births